Your Prayer is the second album by saxophonist Frank Wright. It was recorded in May 1967 in New York City and was released by ESP-Disk later that year. On the album, Wright is joined by saxophonist Arthur Jones, trumpeter Jacques Coursil, bassist Steve Tintweiss, and drummer Muhammad Ali. The tracks were reissued in 2005 on the Frank Wright compilation The Complete ESP-Disk Recordings.

Reception

In a review for AllMusic, Scott Yanow wrote: "For his second and final ESP date as a leader, avant-garde tenor saxophonist Frank Wright teams up with four little-known players... for passionate explorations of four of his originals plus Jones' 'The Lady.' Rather intense at times, these emotional performances... still sound groundbreaking three decades later. One of Frank Wright's finest recordings."

Writing for Stereogum, Michael Nelson commented: "The other horns treat the melodies like fanfares, announcing Wright before he steps up for a fierce solo, but on pieces like 'No End' and particularly the nearly 13-minute 'Fire of Spirits,' everyone gets to have their say. Tintweiss's extended bass solo is actually a highlight of the disc, though the real secret weapon is Coursil's trumpet. Ali's drumming is frantic and ferocious throughout, wiping out the landscape like a forest fire."

In a review for All About Jazz, Clifford Allen stated: "Your Prayer finds Wright refining the bag his solos come from, yet maintaining a firm hold on the ecstatic free-blues shout that makes up most of his solo language... Your Prayer is a rather lengthy slab of high-energy grit, but its unified forward and upward motion make for a firmly rooted sonic liberation."

Track listing
Track 1 by Arthur Jones. Tracks 2-5 by Frank Wright.

 "The Lady" – 9:04
 "Train Stop" – 7:32
 "No End" – 6:49
 "Fire of Spirits" – 12:31
 "Your Prayer" – 15:42

Personnel 
 Frank Wright – tenor saxophone
 Arthur Jones – alto saxophone
 Jacques Coursil – trumpet
 Steve Tintweiss – bass
 Muhammad Ali – drums

References

1967 albums
Frank Wright (jazz musician) albums
ESP-Disk albums